Pakhomovo is a rural locality (a village) in Churovskoye Rural Settlement, Sheksninsky District, Vologda Oblast, Russia. The population was 18 as of 2002.

Geography 
Pakhomovo is located 39 km northeast of Sheksna (the district's administrative centre) by road. Norovka is the nearest rural locality.

References 

Rural localities in Sheksninsky District